Danny Hobbs-Awoyemi (born 7 March 1994) is an English rugby union player who competes for Northampton Saints in the Premiership Rugby.

Club career
A graduate of Northampton Saints academy, he made his first-team debut against Newport Gwent Dragons in the Anglo-Welsh Cup during the 2013–14 season, He signed a professional deal to stay at Franklin's Gardens for the 2014–15 season. He was dual-registered with Championship side Birmingham Moseley from the 2015 season whilst enjoying playing time with the Saints in the Anglo-Welsh Cup.

On 31 March 2016, Hobbs-Awoyemi left Northampton to join London Irish from the 2016–17 season. He made his debut in the RFU Championship opening round winning 19–0 against Doncaster Knights. He signed a two-year contract extension to stay with London Irish until the end of the 2019–20 season.

On 26 June 2020, he resigned with hometown club Northampton Saints on a two-year deal ahead of the 2020–21 season.

International career
He was ever prominent for England in U18s and U20s when he was part of the England squad that won back to back IRB Junior World Championships in 2013 and 2014. He was also with England U20s, that beaten Wales U20s 28–13, to win the 2013 Six Nations Under 20s Championship.

References

External links
Northampton Saints Profile
Its Rugby Profile
Ultimate Rugby Profile

1994 births
Living people
English rugby union players
London Irish players
Northampton Saints players
Rugby union players from Northampton
Rugby union props